was a  after Shōō and before Shōan. This period spanned the years from August 1293 through April 1299.

Change of era
 1293 : The new era name was created to mark an event or a number of events. The previous era ended and a new one commenced in Shō'ō 6.

Events of the Einen era
 August 30, 1298 (Einin 6, 22nd day of the 7th month): In the 11th year of Fushimi-tennōs reign (伏見天皇11年), the emperor abdicated; and the succession (senso) was received by his son.
 November 17, 1298 (Einin 6, 13th day of the 10th month): Emperor Go-Fushimi is said to have acceded to the throne (sokui) and the nengō was changed to Shōan to mark the beginning of a new emperor's reign.
 1299 (Einin 7): The 8th rector of the nunnery at Hokkeji died.

Notes

References
 Nussbaum, Louis-Frédéric and Käthe Roth. (2005).  Japan encyclopedia. Cambridge: Harvard University Press. ;  OCLC 58053128
 Titsingh, Isaac. (1834). Nihon Odai Ichiran; ou,  Annales des empereurs du Japon.  Paris: Royal Asiatic Society, Oriental Translation Fund of Great Britain and Ireland. OCLC 5850691
 Varley, H. Paul. (1980). A Chronicle of Gods and Sovereigns: Jinnō Shōtōki of Kitabatake Chikafusa. New York: Columbia University Press. ;  OCLC 6042764

External links
 National Diet Library, "The Japanese Calendar" -- historical overview plus illustrative images from library's collection
 

Japanese eras
1290s in Japan